This is a list of gliders/sailplanes of the world, (this reference lists all gliders with references, where available) 
Note: Any aircraft can glide for a short time, but gliders are designed to glide for longer.

American miscellaneous constructors 
 ADI Condor – Aircraft Designs Inc
 AEA 1907 glider
 Advanced Aeromarine Sierra – Advanced Aeromarine
 Adventure Aircraft EMG-6 – Adventure Aircraft
 AGA Aviation LRG – USN amphibious twin hull transport glider
 Ahrens AR 124 – Ahrens Aircraft Corporation
 Allen AES-1 ALLEN, E. & WARNER, E. P.
 Allen AES-2 ALLEN, E.
 AmEagle American Eaglet
 American Falcon (sailplane)
 American Spirit XL
 Arup S-1 – Arup Inc (fdr: Cloyd L Snyder), 231 Lincoln Way, South Bend IN.
 Auburn Sun Spot – Auburn, Robert J.
 Baker-McMillan Cadet
 Barnaby 1909 glider
 Bartos/Nobel BN-1 Phantom
 Bauer Bird
 Bennett-Carter Dottie S – George Bennett & Richard Carter
 Berkshire Concept 70 – Berkshire Manufacturing Corporation
 Bikle T-6 – Paul Bikle
 Bock 1 – John W. Bock
 Boeing Steel Truss Glider
 Bowers Bantam
 Bowlus BZ-1 – Michael Bowlus
 Bright Star Swift
 Briegleb BG-12 and Briegleb BG-6
 Bristol XLRQ – Bristol Aeronautical Corporation – Military Amphibian Assault Glider
 Brochocki BKB-1 – Stefan Brochocki, Witold Kasper and A. Bodek
 Brown Rebel
 Buxton Roundair – Jay Buxton
 Buxton Transporter – Jay Buxton
 Cadet UT-1 – Alex Dawydoff – Cadet Aeronautics
 Carnegie Tech Flying Anvil
 Cascade Kasperwing I-80
 Cessna CG-2 – Clyde Cessna
 Champion Freedom Falcon – Ken Champion
 Chanute 1902 glider
 Chanute 1904 glier
 Chanute Katydid
 Chanute-Herring 1896 glider
 Chanute-Huffaker 1901 glider
 Chase-Sisley C100-S – Robert Chase & Sisley
 Christopher AG-1
 Cordas SCS-1 – A.C. Cordas – Wade Steinruck
 Crown City Glider Club Screaming Wiener
 Curtiss Flying Boat glider – Glenn Curtiss
 Daams Falcon – Fred Daams
 Dart Aero-5 – Bob Dart
 Detroit G1 Gull – Detroit Aircraft Corporation
 Domenjoz glider
 Douglas XCG-17 – Douglas Aircraft Company
 DuPont Utility – All American Aviation / Du Pont, Richard
 Engineering Division GL-1
 Engineering Division GL-2
 Engineering Division GL-3
 Explorer PG-1 Aqua Glider aka Skliar PG-1 Aqua Glider – Skliar, Bill – Explorer Aircraft Company Inc.
 Florida BDG-1 – Florida University
 Ford 1930 Primary – Ford, Gilbert
 Ford Bluey – FORD, Gilbert
 Freel Flying Wing – Freel, Charles L. – Aircraft Rigging San Diego High School, Californie.
 Gallaudet Hydrokite – Edson Fessenden Gallaudet
 GATC XCG-16 – General
 Glidersport LightHawk
 Green-Tweed GT-2 – Green, Frank & Tweed, George
 Haig Minibat – Larry Haig
 Heath Super Soarer
 Hendrikson 1908 glider
 Hermanspann Chinook S – Fred Hermanspann & Art Penz
 Hill Flying Wing – Man powered Marske Monarch
 Hill Tetra-15 – Bob Kuykendall, Steve Smith, and Brad Hill
 Hollman Condor – Winther-hollman Aircraft Inc.
 Hutchinson HS-127 – Vernon Hutchinson
 Jobagy Bagyjo
 Johnson RHJ-6 Adastra – Dick Johnson
 Jongblood Primary – Mike Jongblood
 Kelsey K-16 – Kelsey, Frank
 Kelsey Klippety Klop – Kelsey, Frank
 Kennedy K-W – Harold Kennedy and Floyd Watson
 Kiceniuk Icarus – Kiceniuk, Taras – man powered
 Kissinger-Crookes Flying Saucer – Curtiss Kissinger, LeRoy Crookes
 Kohler Alpha – Spud Kohler
 Krutchkoff SHP-1 – HP-14 modification
 Lamson L-106 Alcor – Lamson, Robert
 Lamson PL-1 Quark – Lamson, Phil
 Langley Sailplane – Ernest Langley
 Larson Utility
 Lawrence Water Glider – L.W. Lawrence
 Leffler-MacFarlane LM-1 – Al Leffler, Walt MacFarlane, Bill Meyer
 Leonard Annebula – Bob Leonard
 Leonard 2 seater – Leonard Motorless Aircraft Manufacturing Company of Grand Rapids
 Lesh 1907
 Lesh-Wulpi 1908 glider
 Luenger Beta 1 – Hans Luenger & Josef Kohler
 Martin 1908 glider
 Masak Scimitar – Masak, Peter
 Matteson M-1 – Matteson, Fred H.
 Mattley Primary
 Maxey-Prue Jennie-Mae – Rue, Irwin & Maxey, Lyle – built by Kearns, Franck & Maxey, Lyle
 Mc Allister Yakima Clipper – Mc Allister, Charles
 McDonnell KBD Gargoyle
 McDonnell LBD Gargoyle
 McQuilkin Mach 1 – McQullkin, Robert J.
 Mead Challenger – T.E. Mead
 Mead Rhön Ranger – T.E. Mead
 Melsheimer FM-1 – Melsheimer, Frank
 Michelob Light Eagle – MIT Daedalus Project
 Midwest MU-1 – Midwest Sailplane
 Miller Tern – Terry Miller
 Monaghan Osprey – Richard Monaghan
 Montgomery California 1905 - John J. Montgomery
 Montgomery Defalco 1905 - John J. Montgomery
 Montgomery Evergreen 1911 - John J. Montgomery
 Montgomery Glider #1 1883 - John J. Montgomery
 Montgomery Glider #2 1884 - John J. Montgomery
 Montgomery Glider #3 1885 - John J. Montgomery
 Montgomery Santa Clara 1905 - John J. Montgomery
 Mooney Dust Devil – Walt Mooney
 Moore SS-1 – Arien C. Moore
 NASA Hyper III
 Niedrauer NG-1 – Niedrauer, Jerome
 Niemi Sisu 1A – NIEMI, Leonard A. / Arlington Aircraft Company
 New Jersey S.A. Sesquiplane glider – MILLER & BONOTAUX, Pete
 Noble 1960 – Noble, Bob
 Nordman 1923 – H. J. Nordman – Nordman & Flush
 Northwestern PG-1 – powered CG-4
 Olansky Straton
 Ormand Dieder Glider
 Pacific D-8 – Coward, Ken
 Parker 2nd Ranger – WL Parker
 Parker RP9 T-Bird – (Ray Parker)
 Peel Z-1 Glider Boat
 Perl PG-130 Penetrator – Perl, Harry
 Pennsylvania State University Griffin
 Peterson J-4 Javelin – Peterson, Max A.
 Pierce 0-2-1 – Pierce, Percy
 Pierce 1909 glider – Pierce, Percy
 PIP (glider)
 Posnansky/Fronius PF-1 White Knight – Ponansky, Herman and Fronius, Bob
 Privett MPA – man-powered aircraft
 Princeton Sailwing II
 PSU Griffin
 Purcell Sea Sprite
 Raven Project – Illian, Paul – man-powered aircraft
 Ree Miller Cherokee RM
 Ridgefield PG-2 – powered CG-4
 Roberts Cygnet – Donald Roberts
 Robinson Robin – Robinson, John
 Ross Ranger I – Ross, Vernie
 Ross Ranger II – Ross, Vernie
 Rowley R-100
 Rutan Solitaire – Rutan Aircraft Factory motorglider
 Sands Replica 1929 Primary Glider – Ron Sands Sr.
 Scanlan SG-1A – Thomas W. Scanlan
 Schmutzhart SCH-1 – Berthold Schmutzhart
 Schroder + Peters SP-1 V1
 SCSA Stratosailplane I – Southern California Soaring Association
 SCSA Stratosailplane II – Southern California Soaring Association
 Sellers 1908 Quadruplane glider
 Sesquiplane Glider
 Smith SG-5 Cumulus
 Smith City of Utica – Smith, Stanley W.
 Snead LRH – 1941 USN amphibious twin hull transport glider
 Spratt 1909 glider
 Sparatt 1929 glider
 Stanley Nomad – Stanley, Robert M.
 Starr 1-23HM – Sterling Starr
 Steinruck SCS-1 – Wade Steinruck
 Tangent EMG-5 – Tangent Aircraft (FAR Part 103 / motor glider / experimental)
 Timm AG-2
 Trager-Bierens T-3 Alibi – Kempes Trager and John Bierens
 Tweed GT-1 – George Tweed
 Walker Aria – Walker, Sam
 Walters Sinbad I
 Whisper Motor Glider – Whisper Aircraft
 Whitehead 1897 glider
 Wilkes BMW-1
 Windward Performance SparrowHawk
 Withacker Centerwing
 Zauner OZ-4 – HP-14 modification, Otto Zauner
 Zauner OZ-5 One-Yankee – Otto Zauner

Notes

Further reading

External links

Lists of glider aircraft